Dongchuan District is one of seven districts of the prefecture-level city of Kunming, the capital of Yunnan Province, People's Republic of China. The district was approved to form from the former Dongchuan City by the State Council  on December 6, 1998.

History
Dongchuan was upgraded to a city in 1958. In 1998 Dongchuan was merged into Kunming and became one of its districts.

Geography
Dongchuan is in the north of Kunming's administrative area and borders Sichuan to the north.

The district's highest point, Jiaozi Snow Mountain, is 4330 meters high, and its lowest point is 695 meters. As of 2000 Dongchuan has a population of 275,564. As of 2006, the population was 302,000.

The area around Huagou in the Wumeng mountains has become famous through photographers who discovered the unique local landscape and its Red Earth scenery in the 1990s.

Administrative divisions
The administrative divisions of Dongchuan District are:
 Tongdu Subdistrict
 Bigu Subdistrict
 Tangdan Town
 Yinmin Town
 Awang Town
 Wulong Town
 Hongtudi Town
 Tuobuka Town
 Shekuai Village

Climate

Ethnic groups
Yi ethnic subgroups in Dongchuan are Black Yi , White Yi , and Dry Yi  (Dongchuan City Gazetteer 1995:744). The Black Yi and Dry Yi speak Eastern Yi dialects, while the White Yi speak Chinese. Autonyms of Yi subgroups in Dongchuan are Nisepu  and Gepu .

Other ethnic groups in Dongchuan are Miao (Big Flowery Miao  subgroup), Hui, and Han (Dongchuan City Gazetteer 1995).

Economy
Dongchuan Special Industrial Park.

The Dongchuan mineral resource is rich and it has one of six biggest copper deposits in China. It is verified that there are 3.35 million tons of copper, accounting for a third of the copper reserves in the province.

Notes

References

Citations

Bibliography
 

 Area Code and Postal Code in Yunnan Province

External links

 Dongchuan District Public Information Network - Official Website

County-level divisions of Kunming
Tourism in Yunnan